Lee David Harris (born 20 July 1962) is an English drummer and musician. Harris attended The Deanes School with Paul Webb, and they became good friends. They played in the reggae band Eskalator before being recruited to form Talk Talk in 1981. Harris played drums for Talk Talk until 1991. In the early 1990s, he and Webb formed .O.rang. He played drums on the Beth Gibbons and Webb album Out of Season (2002), Midnight Choir's Waiting for the Bricks to Fall (2003) and Bark Psychosis' Codename: Dustsucker (2004). He was also part of Ian Tregoning's Magnetik North project.

References

External links

Living people
1962 births
British male drummers
English rock drummers